Admiral Sampson Edwards (c. 1744 – 14 September 1840) was a British naval officer.

Career 
Edwards commanded the Canada schooner at Newfoundland station, where she was wrecked in a gale of wind.

Edwards was promoted to Post-Captain on 16 October 1781.

Edwards was promoted to Rear-Admiral on 1 January 1801.

Edwards was promoted to Vice-Admiral on 13 December 1806.

Edwards was promoted to Admiral on 4 June 1814.

Edwards contributed £50 toward the building of the Royal Naval School, a boarding school for the sons of officers in the Royal Navy and Royal Marines from 1833 to 1910.

Death 
Edwards died on 14 September 1840 in Ringwood, Hampshire, at the age of 95.

References 

Royal Navy admirals
1740s births
1840 deaths
Year of birth uncertain